Nadroga FA is a professional Fijian association football team playing in the Fiji Premier League of the Fiji Football Association. It is based in Sigatoka. They are nicknamed The Stallions. Their home stadium is Lawaqa Park.

History
Nadroga F.C. came into existence in 1938, with the formation of the Nadroga Soccer Association, under the Presidency of Dildar Masih. Nadroga took part in the
Inter-District Championship (IDC) for the first time in 1939, losing to the neighbouring team of Nadi by 2 goals to nil in the preliminary round.

Achievements 
Fiji Premier League
Champions (3): 1989, 1990, 1993

 Fiji Senior League
  Champions (1): 2020

 Inter-District Championship
Champions (3): 1988, 1989, 1993

 Inter-District Championship - Senior Division
Champions (3): 1999, 2017, 2020

Battle of the Giants
Champions (3): 1989, 1991, 2002

Fiji FACT
Champions (2): 1993, 2001

Current squad

Staff

External links
 M. Prasad, Sixty Years of Soccer in Fiji 1938 – 1998: The Official History of the Fiji Football Association, Fiji Football Association, Suva, 1998.

Football clubs in Fiji
1938 establishments in Fiji